Anthracite iron or anthracite pig iron is the substance created by the smelting together of anthracite coal and iron ore, that is using anthracite coal instead of charcoal to smelt iron ores—and was an important historic advance in the late-1830s, enabling a great acceleration of the industrial revolution in Europe and North America.

History
Unlike many seminal advances, the contributors, place and date of this epoch are well recorded within specific moments in the late 1830s.  The first repeatable and reliably successful furnaces and smelts were managed by the same person in both the United Kingdom and the United States, in the principal control and supervision of Ironmaster David Thomas who had begun experimenting with attempts to use locally available Welsh anthracite deposits as early as 1820 soon after he became in charge at Yniscedewin Iron Works in Wales.  About this 1837-38 timeframe experiments were also being made in Pennsylvania near Port Carbon, and in Mauch Chunk, but with overall better success than in Wales.  White, Hazard and the LC&N Co. had begun systematic experiments to smelt using anthracite in two furnaces in Mauch Chunk in 1832–1837 with intermittent but sporadically improved successes using cold blast processes with two differently designed furnaces. 
  

 
The first American smelt of Anthracite Pig Iron was performed July 4, 1840 by principal-partners David Thomas, Josiah White and Erskine Hazard at their Lehigh Crane Iron Works in their first hot blast furnace along Catasauqua Creek aided by Samuel Thomas and the employees of the LCIW, in what became Catasauqua in Northampton County, Pennsylvania.  The technology enabled industries the chance to produce cast iron sufficient to demand and eventually adapt production to also feed the demand to generate wrought iron and steel.  These useful materials are achieved by adding additional processing—by taking pig iron as an ingredient into a reverberatory furnace (and in later years, a Bessemer converter).

Anthracite, also known as stone coal or rock coal, is very difficult to ignite, mine, clean, and break into smaller chunks and requires correct conditions to build heat or hold temperature and sustain burning—which oft depend upon the size and uniformity of the coal particles. Yet American cities were cramped for fuels, woodlands were exhausted near bigger towns and Philadelphia, largest city in America needed fuels for mills and foundries as well to sustain manufacturing.  Inventor and industrialist Josiah White (owner of a wire mill, foundry and nail factory), had determined how to burn anthracite in iron working processing furnaces during the War of 1812, but its use in smelting operations was hit or miss, dependent upon the material packing geometries of any particular charging load in a cold blast furnace.  The earlier development of coking of bituminous coal, as well anthracite coke enabled the smelting of iron using local coal sources with cold blast air in blast furnaces after the latter 1830s allowed the production of the vast quantities of iron that built the fundamental infrastructure of the early North American Industrial Revolution—which was built on iron products and only some steel. At the time, iron was used minimally with respect to wood. Even most railroad tracks were laid with wooden rails, sometimes covered by iron strapping. As more iron became available, more uses were found for iron, creating a cycle of increasing demand, experimentation and improvements—part of the revolution in industrial revolution.

Development of the process
During the United States' first energy crisis stands of forest near larger towns and America's Eastern Seaboard cities became farther and farther from population and factory centers, raising the price of fuel for heating and smithies, especially clean burning charcoal—long the fuel of preference for smelting and glass making, creating a decades long search for alternative fuels. By mid-1792 prominent Philadelphians had formed the Lehigh Coal Mine Company (LHCM Co.) to bring Anthracite to cities reachable via the Delaware River Valley, especially Philadelphia—the nation's largest and most industrialized city, though no one fully understood how to use anthracite as a sole fuel—just that it 'could' burn 'some' of the time with a hot enough base fire, so could augment furnace fuels. 
 
In the midst of the War of 1812 iron industry magnate Josiah White set his foremen to systematically conducting experiments as how 'stone coal' could be made to burn reliably. It was recognized as some use aiding other fuels, and pack animal loads occasionally reached the city, which had mills and foundries desperately needing to circumvent the British Naval Blockade, so Bituminous Coal coastal shipments up from Virginia might resume. These experiments established a bottom draught and closed doors (reflection or reverberatory furnace techniques) were the key. Before the war, Baltimore, New York, Newark, New Haven, Boston, and Philadelphia industrialists were importing Bituminous via shipload from Virginia and Great Britain, and these supplies became difficult to obtain or blocked politically by the war and its preceding embargoes on British goods. After the war, the sanctions continued until various boundary disputes were resolved as far away as The Oregon Country and the Columbia River basin.

Historical backdrop
Meanwhile, between 1814 and 1818 industries along the Eastern Seaboard were still thirsting for energy relief when inquiries to the LHCM Co. by Hazard & White indicated the operation & rights of the company were available.  Frustrated by the snail-like progress of improvements that would become the Schuylkill Canal, White & Hazard applied to the Pennsylvania legislature for the rights to improve and operate navigations upon the rapids-strewn Lehigh River initiating the process that lead to the Lehigh Canal—beginning regular high volume & reliable coal deliveries in late 1820—and the great changes a flood of anthracite would create in the next century.

Iron from Anthracite smelting
Research into the smelting of iron using anthracite coal (without coking it first) began in the 1820s in Wales by Thomas, experiments in France, most notably by Gueymard and Robin at Vizille in 1827, and in the 1830s in Pottsville & Mauch Chunk, Pennsylvania.  Early attempts tried to gradually substitute anthracite for other fuels, such as coke or charcoal, but all failed due to the use of cold blast techniques, which generated insufficient heat to keep the anthracite in regenerative combustion. In the same time-frame, Thomas had also continued experimenting with mixes of Anthracite and other fuels, before he combined those experiments and the new hot blast processing.

 
In the United States, where the Lehigh Coal & Navigation Company (LC&N) had begun shipping anthracite to Philadelphia in 1820 because the principles could not obtain sufficient fuels for their iron works at the 'Falls of the Schuylkill' —so had built the Lehigh Canal and taken over the works of the haphazard Lehigh Coal Mine Company—by the late 1820s having established works that were running smoothly, after building America's second operating railroad in 1827, they'd great interest in exploiting the great anthracite deposits of Schuylkill County for ironmaking, which mills foundries were their principle businesses. 
 
The Franklin Institute, in 1830, offered a gold medal to the manufacturer of the greatest quantity of anthracite iron, and Nicholas Biddle and his associates offered a prize of $5,000 to the first individual to smelt a certain quantity of iron ore within a given time, using anthracite. The Lehigh Coal & Navigation, by then an industrial giant of the times, also offered free water power and discount rates on coal and shipping to encourage the development of the process.

The first key breakthrough occurred in 1828–29, when Scotsman James Beaumont Neilson patented the hot blast technique & process, which he had conceived in an attempt to improve the efficiency of conventionally fueled furnaces. The first person to employ the hot blast technique to anthracite smelting was Dr. Frederick W. Gesenhainer, who filed for a patent on the process in 1831 and received it in 1833. In 1836, he tried smelting anthracite iron on a practical scale at his property, Valley Furnace, near Pottsville, Pennsylvania, while in the same year White & Hazard's LC&N Co. built two experimental blast furnaces in Mauch Chunk. He produced a small quantity of iron, but due to mechanical breakdowns, could not keep the furnace in operation for more than two months. While distinguished visitors, including Governor Joseph Ritner, acknowledged his success, he sold out his share in Valley Furnace and went to New York City.

The research was proceeding along parallel lines across the Atlantic. George Crane, owner, and David Thomas, superintendent of the Yniscedwyn Iron Works, had themselves conceived of the idea of using hot blast to smelt anthracite. Thomas was sent to Scotland to examine Neilson's installation and reproduced it at Yniscedwyn. Crane filed for a British patent on smelting iron with anthracite and hot blast in 1836 and received it in 1837. By the time the patent was sealed, Yniscedwyn was producing about 35 tons of iron using anthracite only as a fuel.

Inspired both by Geisenhainer and Crane (whose success was closely followed by the LC&N), experiments in the US continued. Baughman, Guiteau and Company used an old furnace near Mauch Chunk to produce some anthracite iron during late 1837. They built another experimental furnace nearby, which was worked for about two months during fall and winter 1838 and for some time in 1839, but mechanical deficiencies led them to abandon the furnace at the end of 1839. In the meantime, Pioneer Furnace, in Pottsville, was blown in using anthracite fuel in 1839. It was built by William Lyman obtained the aid of a Welsh emigrant, Benjamin Perry, who was familiar with Neilson's process and the Yniscedwyn works, for the blowing-in. The furnace ran for three months on anthracite alone and fulfilled the conditions to win the $5,000 prize. In the design of Pioneer Furnace, Lyman had also been assisted by David Thomas, who had arrived in the United States in May 1839. Thomas was engaged by the LC&N to set up the Lehigh Crane Iron Company and its first furnace at Catasauqua, which went into blast in 1840, along with five other anthracite furnaces. This marked the commercial establishment of anthracite iron production in the United States.

Decline
The opening of bituminous coal deposits suitable for coking in the western part of the Allegheny Plateau resulted in the gradual displacement of anthracite as a fuel. The production of coke-fired furnaces overtook that of anthracite-fired furnaces in 1875, and the last anthracite furnaces in the US, the former Lock Ridge Iron Company, converted to coke in 1914.

Explanatory notes

Citations

Sources

General references 
 
 
 
 
 

Ferrous alloys
Iron
Metalworking
Smelting
Steelmaking